James McEachin (born May 20, 1930) is an American author and retired actor.

Military career
McEachin served in the United States Army before, and then during, the Korean War. Serving in King Company, 9th Infantry Regiment (United States), 2nd Infantry Division, he was wounded (nearly fatally) in an ambush and nearly left for dead. McEachin was one of only two soldiers to survive the ambush. He was awarded both the Purple Heart and Silver Star in 2005 by California Congressman David Dreier after McEachin participated in a Veterans History Project interview for Dreier's office and Dreier's staff, Carlos Cortez, discovered McEachin had no copies of his own military records. Dreier's staff quickly traced the records and notified McEachin of the Silver Star commendation, then awarded him all seven of his medals of valor shortly thereafter, fifty years after his service.

Civilian career

Following his military career, McEachin dabbled in civil service, first as a fireman and then a policeman in Hackensack, New Jersey, before he moved to California and became a record producer. Known as Jimmy Mack in the industry, he worked with young artists such as Otis Redding and went on to produce The Furys. He began his acting career shortly after, and was signed by Universal as a contract actor in the 1960s.

He was regularly cast in professional, "solid citizen" occupational roles, such as a lawyer or a police commander, guesting on numerous series such as Hawaii Five-O, Rockford Files, Mannix, The Feather and Father Gang, The Eddie Capra Mysteries, Matlock, Jake and the Fatman,  Diagnosis Murder, Dragnet, It Takes a Thief, and Adam-12, and in television movies including Welcome Home, Johnny Bristol (1972); The Alpha Caper (1973) and The Dead Don't Die (1975). He appeared in such feature films as Uptight (1968); If He Hollers, Let Him Go! (1968); The Undefeated (1969); The Lawyer (1970); Buck and the Preacher (1972); The Groundstar Conspiracy (1972) and Fuzz (1972).

McEachin played Mr. Turner, a tax collector for the Internal Revenue Service, and later a character named Solomon Jackson, a co-worker that Archie Bunker tries to recruit for his social club, on the television show All in the Family. He played the deejay Sweet Al Monte in Play Misty for Me (1971) with Clint Eastwood. In 1973, he starred as Harry Tenafly, the title character in Tenafly, a short-lived detective series about a police officer turned private detective who relied on his wits and hard work rather than guns and fistfights. As the star of that show, he is (along with Susan Saint James of McMillan and Wife) one of the last surviving actors to have starred as a title character from a series featured on the 1970s' NBC Mystery Movie. McEachin also appeared occasionally as Lieutenant Ron Crockett on Emergency!. In 1978, he played a police officer in Every Which Way But Loose. In 1979, he played the role of a jaded ex-marine high school baseball coach in an episode ("Out at Home") of The White Shadow.

He made his third film with Eastwood in 1983 when he starred as Detective Barnes in the fourth Dirty Harry movie, Sudden Impact. He also appeared as Dr. Victor Millson, chairman of the fictitious National Council of Astronautics in the 1984 movie 2010. In addition to his appearing role with Roy Scheider, his character often appears in video dispatches transmitted to the American astronauts in the film. While continuing to guest star in many television series and appearing in several feature-length films, McEachin landed his most memorable role, that of Police Lieutenant Brock in the 1986 television movie Perry Mason: The Case of the Notorious Nun. He would reprise this role in more than a dozen Perry Mason telemovies from 1986 until 1995, starring opposite Raymond Burr. He appeared in the 1994 crime thriller Double Exposure.

In the 1990s, he semi-retired from acting to pursue a writing career. His first work was a military history of the court-martial of 63 black American soldiers during the First World War, titled Farewell to the Mockingbirds (1995), which won the 1998 Benjamin Franklin Award. His next works, mainly fiction novels, included The Heroin Factor (1999), Say Goodnight to the Boys in Blue (2000), The Great Canis Lupus (2001), and Tell Me a Tale: A Novel of the Old South (2003). He published Pebbles in the Roadway in 2003, a collection of short stories and essays which he describes as "a philosophical view of America and Americans". In 2005, McEachin produced the award-winning audio book Voices: A Tribute to the American Veteran.

In early 2006, the film short Reveille, in which McEachin starred with David Huddleston, played to troops in Afghanistan and Iraq, and people requested copies of the film. The film was posted on video.google.com and quickly garnered 1.5 million hits and a deluge of fan mail to the jamesmceachin.com website; this inspired McEachin's latest contribution, Old Glory, which he wrote, produced, directed, and starred. Old Glory was McEachin's directorial debut.

In 2001, McEachin received the Distinguished Achievement Award from Morgan State University. In 2005, he became an Army Reserve Ambassador; this distinction carries the protocol of a two-star general.  As part of his work on behalf of the military and veterans, McEachin has participated in ceremonies for Purple Hearts Reunited, a charitable organization that works to return lost and stolen military awards to the recipients or their families.

Personal life

McEachin married the former Lois Emma Davis in 1960. Their three grown children are Alainia, Lyle, and Felecia, who was personal assistant to, among others, Ice Cube and (the late) Emmy Award-winning director, producer and writer Sam Simon. Lois McEachin died in 2017, in Encino, California.

The pronunciation of "McEachin", as he used it in a public service ad for the Army Relief Agency, rhymes with "beach in".

Filmography
1966: The Black Klansman as Lonnie
1968: Where Were You When the Lights Went Out? as Policeman (uncredited)
1968: The Legend of Lylah Clare as Reporter (uncredited)
1968: Coogan's Bluff as Man (uncredited)
1968: If He Hollers, Let Him Go! as Defense Counsel
1968: Uptight as Mello
1968: Adam-12 as Officer Wood
1968: Hawaii Five-O as Captain John Anderson
1969: True Grit as Judge Parker's Bailiff (uncredited)
1969: The Undefeated as Jimmy Collins
1969: Hello, Dolly! as Laborer (uncredited)
1970: The Lawyer as Striker
1971: Play Misty for Me as Al Monte
1972: Buck and the Preacher as Kingston
1972: The Groundstar Conspiracy as Bender
1972: Fuzz as Det. Arthur Brown
1972: Columbo "Etude in Black" S2Ep2 as Billy Jones
1974: Christina as Donovan
1974: Emergency! S4Ep5 as Police Detective Lt. Crockett
1975: Emergency! S5Ep9 as Police Detective Lt. Crockett
1977: Emergency! S6Ep24 as a musician.
1978: Every Which Way But Loose as Herb
1978: Columbo "Make Me a Perfect Murder" S7E3 as Projectionist Walter Mearhead 
1980: The White Shadow S2Ep19 as baseball coach Jake Owens
1983: Sudden Impact as Detective Barnes
1984: 2010 as Victor Milson
1986: Matlock The Cop
1987: Hunter S4EP12
1994: Double Exposure'' as Detective Becker

References

External links
Old Glory - movie homepage
 Retrieved on 2008-02-04

1930 births
Living people
People from Robeson County, North Carolina
African-American male actors
American male actors
African-American writers
American writers
United States Army personnel of the Korean War
Actors from Hackensack, New Jersey
Recipients of the Silver Star
United States Army soldiers
Writers from Hackensack, New Jersey
20th-century African-American people
21st-century African-American people